Sands Consolidated Independent School District is a public school district based in Ackerly, Texas (USA).

The district serves parts of four counties - southeast Dawson, northeast Martin, southwest Borden, and northwest Howard.

Sands Consolidated ISD has one school that serves students in grades pre-kindergarten (pre-k) through twelve.

Academic achievement
In 2009, the school district was rated "recognized" by the Texas Education Agency.

Special programs

Athletics
Sands High School plays six-man football.

See also

List of school districts in Texas

References

External links
Sands Consolidated ISD

School districts in Dawson County, Texas
School districts in Martin County, Texas
School districts in Borden County, Texas
School districts in Howard County, Texas